Ernest Alvia "Smokey" Smith  (3 May 1914 – 3 August 2005) was a Canadian recipient of the Victoria Cross, the highest award for gallantry in the face of the enemy that can be awarded to British and Commonwealth forces. He was the last living Canadian recipient of the Victoria Cross.

Early life and career
Born in New Westminster, British Columbia, Smith came of age during the Great Depression and, along with many others, struggled to find steady employment. 

He was 25 when he joined the Canadian Army on 5 March 1940, becoming part of The Seaforth Highlanders of Canada. In 1943, he first entered into combat. On 10 July 1943, he was part of the 1st Canadian Infantry Division landing in Sicily, remaining active throughout the Sicily and Italian campaign between July 1943 and February 1945.

On the night of 21/22 October 1944 at the River Savio, in northern Italy, Private Smith was in the spearhead of the attack which established a bridgehead over the river. With a PIAT anti-tank launcher he disabled a Mark V Panther tank at a range of just 30 feet (10 metres), and while protecting a wounded comrade, killed four panzergrenadiers and routed others. When another tank was sent to take out his position, he used another PIAT to damage it enough to cause it to retreat. He then carried his wounded comrade, and later joined a counterattack to disperse the Germans still attacking his previous position. The squad destroyed three Panther tanks, two self-propelled artillery pieces, a half-track, a scout car, and a large number of German soldiers. Smith had been promoted to corporal nine times, but demoted back to private each time prior to his actions at the River Savio. He later achieved the rank of sergeant.

Citation

Later military career
King George VI bestowed the VC on Smith personally at Buckingham Palace. Allegedly, Smith was placed in a jail cell in Rome the night before he was to be commended for his actions at Savio, in order to "keep him out of trouble"; for years, Smith would neither confirm nor deny that such a measure was enacted. However in a 2003 interview with MacLeans Magazine’s Ken MacQueen, Smith described the event: “I got locked up in Naples. They just wanted Smoky to be in the right spot. When I was first locked up, I was thinking, what the hell? But then they gave me a couple of beers and I was very happy.” 

Smith was asked what was it like to meet the King?  “It was kind of astounding. I go to Buckingham Palace and I say to the guard, “What am I supposed to do?” He says, “You do exactly as I do: take a bow from the hips.” I said, “Oh Christ, you think I’m going to do that, you’re crazy.” I just saluted and that was it.

I was given the VC and told to put it in my pocket. I wasn’t allowed to wear it for at least three days so the Canadian newspapers would have it the same time as the British ones. So for three days, I’m sitting in a bar in London drinking to beat hell. Someone came and said, “Okay, Smoky, you can put on that medal now.” So I took it out and put it on my chest, and I never bought another drink that day.”

After receiving the VC, Smokey Smith was made a "poster boy" for the Canadian War Bonds drive.

Smith left the service after World War II, but returned in 1950 when he re-enlisted during the Korean War. Because of his iconic status, he was not put into combat. He retired from service again in 1964, having served for some time in Vancouver as a recruiting sergeant. As a result of his extended service, he received the Canadian Forces Decoration for 12 years of service.

He was an honorary member of the Royal Military College of Canada, student # S132.

Civilian life
In 1947, Smith wed Esther Weston and subsequently sired two children, David and Norma-Jean. After his retirement from the military, Smith opened a travel agency with his wife, "Smith Travel", which was in operation from 1969 to 1992. During these years, Smith regularly visited sites related to World War II with clients. The couple retired in 1992, and Smith's wife died four years later, in 1996.

In his later years, as the number of living veterans began to grow thin, Smokey found himself the last living Canadian VC recipient in 2000. By this time Smith was retired and devoted much of his time to helping his fellow veterans, making frequent public appearances all over the world to assist in Remembrance Day ceremonies and greeting the Queen after her arrival during an official visit. He appeared in May 2000 in representation of the veterans of Canada at the consecration ceremony of Canada's Tomb of the Unknown Soldier, having aided in negotiations for the return of those remains.  Smith was also on hand to unveil a Canadian postage stamp featuring both the British and Canadian versions of the Victoria Cross in 2004. The Canadian Pacific Railway dedicated a railcar in his honour on November 29, 2003.

Smith was appointed a Member of the Order of Canada on November 15, 1995 and received the honour in a ceremony on February 15, 1996. He became a Member of the Order of British Columbia in 2002. Gary Pawson nominated him for the Order of British Columbia starting in 1997, and each year following until he was finally so honoured. He was originally passed over for this honour until Clifford Chadderton, the British Columbia Ministry of Veterans Affairs, and several other organizations, wrote letters to the Lieutenant-Governor of British Columbia in his support.

Death and funeral

Smokey Smith died at his home in Vancouver on August 3, 2005 at the age of 91. His body was placed in the foyer of the House of Commons to lie in state on August 9, 2005, making him only the ninth person to be accorded this honour; government flags flew at half-mast on that day. He lay in repose at Vancouver's Seaforth Armoury on August 12, with a full military funeral in Vancouver on August 13. His ashes were scattered at sea in the Gulf of Georgia.

Memorials 
Smith donated his VC and medals to the Seaforth Highlanders of Canada in his will. The regiment has his Victoria Cross decoration and his full sized medals are [in 2011] in a safe deposit box. The Seaforth Highlanders of Canada Museum and Archives had a replica VC and set of medals and a generic World War II uniform on display. Three original uniforms from his Black Watch period were donated to three museums by his daughter in 2011, one each to the Black Watch Museum in Montreal, the Seaforth Highlanders of Canada Museum and Archives in Vancouver and the New Westminster Museum and Archives. His 1947 dated battledress blouse and one of his Glengarries are in a private collection.

The Ernest Smith Park was erected as a memorial by Ottawa, Ontario assisted by the Royal Canadian Legion Branch 638 (Kanata), and is dedicated to Private Ernest Alvia Smith, VC, CM, OBC, C.D.

In the Robert Heinlein novel Starship Troopers, Camp Sergeant Smokey Smith (located in the Canadian Rockies, B.C.) may be a referral to Ernest Smith, although this is never explicitly stated.

Honours and awards

 He received the Honorary degree of Doctor of Military Science from the Royal Military College of Canada on 18 January 2001.

References

External links
Obituary in The Globe and Mail
Obituary in  The Toronto Star
'Smokey' Smith's ashes flown to Ottawa
Order of Canada Citation
CBC radio archives clip about Smokey
Veterans Affair Canada biography page: SMITH, Ernest Alvia 
CBC transcript – Smokey is interviewed but the transcriber lists him as "Unidentified Veteran
new release about Smokey's OBC
VIDEO CLIP CBC news 29 October 2004 – Smokey returns to Italy 60 years later
Canada Veterans Affair photogallery 

1914 births
2005 deaths
Canadian World War II recipients of the Victoria Cross
Canadian military personnel of the Korean War
Members of the Order of British Columbia
Members of the Order of Canada
People from New Westminster
Canadian Army personnel of World War II
Seaforth Highlanders of Canada
Seaforth Highlanders of Canada soldiers
Canadian military personnel from British Columbia